The Euphiletos Painter was an Attic black-figure vase painter active in the second half of the sixth century BC.

One of the better-quality vase painters of the black-figure style in Athens, he is known especially for his Panathenaic prize amphorae. In them, his work evinces a chronological development influenced extensively by red-figure vase painting, a style developing during his lifetime. While his early works show athletes in unrealistic stances, the quality of the depictions improved considerably over time, especially with regard to his increasing control of internal detail. This improvement is especially visible in human depictions and in shield devices. His work on vases other than prize amphorae is of lesser quality and often depicts the then-popular motif of chariot races. Most of his non-prize amphora work dates to about 520 BC, but some pieces are estimated to be up to 20 years earlier or later. He collaborated with the potter Pamphaios.

Bibliography 
 John Beazley: Attic Black-Figure Vase-Painters, Oxford 1956, p.
 John Beazley: Paralipomena. Additions to Attic black-figure vase-painters and to Attic red-figure vase-painters. Oxford 1971. p.
 John Boardman: Schwarzfigurige Vasen aus Athen. Ein Handbuch, Mainz 1977, p. 123

Ancient Greek vase painters
Artists of ancient Attica
6th-century BC Athenians
Anonymous artists of antiquity